Hýľov is a village and municipality in Košice-okolie District in the Kosice Region of eastern Slovakia.

History
In historical records the village was first mentioned in 1318.

Geography
The village lies at an altitude of 490 metres and covers an area of 23.861 km². It has a population of about 430 people.

Genealogical resources

The records for genealogical research are available at the state archive "Statny Archiv in Kosice, Levoca,

Slovakia"

 Roman Catholic church records (births/marriages/deaths): 1736-1896 (parish A)
 Greek Catholic church records (births/marriages/deaths): 1727-1911 (parish B)

See also
 List of municipalities and towns in Slovakia

External links

Surnames of living people in Hylov

Villages and municipalities in Košice-okolie District